Creole may refer to:

Anthropology 
 Creole peoples, ethnic groups which originated from linguistic, cultural, and often racial mixing of colonial-era emigrants from Europe with non-European peoples
 Criollo people, the historic name of people of full or near full Spanish descent in Colonial Hispanic America and the Philippines.
 Louisiana Creole people, people descended from the inhabitants of colonial Louisiana before it became a part of the United States during the period of both French and Spanish rule
 Creole language, a language that originated as a mixed language. Many creole languages are known by their speakers as some variant of "creole", for example spelled Kriol.
List of creole languages
English-based creole languages, sometimes abbreviated English creoles
French-based creole languages, also termed Bourbonnais creole or Mascarene creole in western Indian Ocean islands

Music
 Creole music, a genre of folk music in Louisiana, the United States

Performers and record labels
 La Compagnie Créole, French music group
 Kid Creole and the Coconuts, American music group
 The Kidd Creole (b. 1960), American rapper
 Creole Records, a record label

Works
 La créole, an 1875 opéra comique, with music by Jacques Offenbach
 Creole (album), a 1998 album by David Murray released on the Justin Time label
 "Creole" (song), a 2006 song from the album B'Day by Beyonce

Ships
 French ship Créole, various ships of the French Navy
 Creole, an American slave ship involved in the Creole case

Other uses
 Creole (markup), a common wiki markup language to be used across different wikis
 Creole, Louisiana, a community in Cameron Parish, Louisiana
 Creole Petroleum Corporation, an American oil company formed in 1920 and nationalized by Venezuela in 1976
 Louisiana Creole cuisine, a style of cooking originating in Louisiana

See also
 
 
 Broken English (disambiguation)
 Creola (disambiguation)
 Criollo (disambiguation)
 Crioulo (disambiguation)
 Krio (disambiguation)
 Pidgin, a simplified language originating from a blend of languages
 List of English-based pidgins
 Pidgin (disambiguation)

Language and nationality disambiguation pages